Tabaille-Usquain is a commune in the Pyrénées-Atlantiques department and Nouvelle-Aquitaine region of south-western France.

Population

See also
Communes of the Pyrénées-Atlantiques department

References

Communes of Pyrénées-Atlantiques